Valdilecha is a small rural town in the outskirts of the region of Madrid, Spain, east-southeast of the town of Arganda del Rey.

References 

Municipalities in the Community of Madrid